Finny (or Finney) is a small village and townland in County Mayo, Ireland. The village is situated in the civil parish of Ross, in the Barony of Ross. Finny is located on the R300 regional road. The nearby Finny River, rising from the south-east of Loch Na Fooey drains westward into the southwest part of Lough Mask. Finny is approximately 10 km to the west of Clonbur, County Galway, 11 km to the east of Leenaun, County Galway and 17 km south west of Toormakeady, County Mayo.

Culture
Finny is an Irish-speaking district within the Gaeltacht of south Mayo and is also located within the cultural district of Joyce Country.

Religion
The Catholic Church of the Immaculate Conception in Finny was completed in 1921. The building is unusual for the area in that it is Latin American in style evoking comparisons with Saint Patrick's Catholic Church in Recess, County Galway.

See also
 List of towns and villages in Ireland

References

External links

Towns and villages in County Mayo